Medișoru may refer to one of two villages in Harghita County, Romania:

 Medișoru Mare, a village in Șimonești Commune
 Medișoru Mic, a village in Avrămești Commune